The Evens are a Washington, D.C. indie-rock duo, formed in the fall of 2001, comprising partners Ian MacKaye (baritone guitar, vocals) (of Fugazi, formerly of Minor Threat) and Amy Farina (drums, vocals) (formerly of The Warmers). After Ian MacKaye's band Fugazi entered a hiatus, The Evens began practicing extensively, and eventually played a few shows and recorded a self-titled album, released in March 2005 on MacKaye's label, Dischord Records. The Evens are known for their unusual choices in venues for performances and the stylistic change from what many have dubbed the "D.C." or "Dischord" sound. The Washington Post has described the sound as "what happens when post-hardcore becomes post-post-hardcore."

History
The Evens first gained notice in late 2003 when they created a video for their original children's song "Vowel Movement", which was made for Pancake Mountain, a Washington, D.C. internet-based children's program. The clip fueled furthered rumors of Fugazi's breakup amid their hiatus, while adding speculation as to MacKaye's new musical direction. The song featured sing-along lines and upbeat music in the vein of Sesame Street and other children's educational programs, while the video showed dancing children and colorful vowels.

In June and July 2006, MacKaye and Farina recorded new music that they wrote earlier in that year. On November 6, 2006, they released their second album entitled Get Evens, which featured this new music.

The band released their last album The Odds would on November 20, 2012. The album was listed 45th on Stereogum's list of top 50 albums of 2012.

Discography
 The Evens LP (2005)
 Get Evens LP (2006)
 2 Songs 7" (2011)
 The Odds LP (2012)

References

External links
 The Evens at Dischord Records
 The Evens at Bandcamp

Dischord Records artists
Indie rock musical groups from Washington, D.C.
Rock music duos
Musical groups established in 2001
Punk rock groups from Washington, D.C.